The 2007 PEI Labatt Tankard, the men's curling provincial championships for Prince Edward Island, was held during late January and early February. The open playdowns were held at the Crapaud Community Curling Club from January 26–29, while the final eight playdowns were held at the Cornwall Curling Club from February 6–11. The winner of the Tankard was Peter Gallant, who won his first Tankard as a skip. He and his rink represented PEI at the 2007 Tim Hortons Brier in Hamilton, Ontario, where they finished tied for eighth place at 4–7.

Open Playdowns

The open playdowns consisted of 21 teams playing in a triple-knockout format. The top eight teams advanced to the final round.

Final round

Teams

Standings

Round-robin results

Draw 1
Tuesday, February 6, 3:00 pm

Draw 2
Wednesday, February 7, 2:00 pm

Draw 3
Wednesday, February 7, 7:30 pm

Draw 4
Thursday, February 8, 2:00 pm

Draw 5
Thursday, February 8, 7:00 pm

Draw 6
Friday, February 9, 2:00 pm

Draw 7
Friday, February 9, 7:00 pm

Playoffs

1 vs. 2
Saturday, February 10, 2:00 pm

3 vs. 4
Saturday, February 10, 2:00 pm

Semifinal
Saturday, February 10, 7:00 pm

Final
Sunday, February 11, 3:00 pm

External links
2007 PEI Labatt Tankard Home Page

2007 in Prince Edward Island
2007 in Canadian curling
Curling competitions in Prince Edward Island
Cornwall, Prince Edward Island